Nathaniel Martin Jacquet (born September 2, 1975) is a former American football wide receiver in the National Football League (NFL). He was drafted by the Indianapolis Colts in the fifth round of the 1997 NFL Draft. He played college football at San Diego State.

Jacquet also played for the Miami Dolphins, San Diego Chargers, Minnesota Vikings and Carolina Panthers.

References

1975 births
Living people
People from Duarte, California
Sportspeople from Los Angeles County, California
Players of American football from California
American football wide receivers
American football return specialists
San Diego State Aztecs football players
Indianapolis Colts players
Miami Dolphins players
San Diego Chargers players
Minnesota Vikings players
Carolina Panthers players